The FIA WTCR Race of Russia is a round of the World Touring Car Championship, which was held for the first time in 2013 at the Moscow Raceway until 2015 in Volokolamsk,  from the capital, Moscow. 

The event returned in 2021, but the venue was relocated to the Sochi Autodrom. The event was also included in the 2022 calendar, but it was deferred to 2023 due to the ongoing Russian invasion of Ukraine.

Winners

References

Russia
Russia
Auto races in Russia